Nazareth is the debut album by the Scottish hard rock band Nazareth, released in 1971. The album featured the hit single "Dear John," and a cover of "Morning Dew."

Track listing

30th anniversary bonus tracks

Personnel 
Nazareth
 Dan McCafferty - lead vocals
 Darrell Sweet - drums, backing vocals
 Pete Agnew - bass guitar, guitar, back vocals, lead vocals (4)
 Manny Charlton - guitar, backing vocals
Additional musicians
 Dave Stewart - organ (5)
 Pete Wingfield - piano (2, 7)
 Pete York - congas, jawbone, tambourine (9)
 B.J. Cole - slide guitar (7)
 Colin Frechter - string and brass arrangements (5, 9)
Technical
 Mike Brown - remastering
 Robert M. Corich - liner notes, remastering
 Roy Thomas Baker - engineer
 John Punter - strings overdubbed 
 Dave Hitchcock - producer
 C.C.S. Associates - sleeve design
 Jim Wilson - photography

References

External links 
 Lyrics to songs from Nazareth

Nazareth (band) albums
1971 debut albums
Mooncrest Records albums
Warner Records albums
A&M Records albums
Philips Records albums
Vertigo Records albums
albums recorded at Trident Studios